Constructions Aéronautiques Émile Dewoitine was a French aircraft manufacturer established by Émile Dewoitine at Toulouse in October 1920. The company's initial products were a range of metal parasol-wing fighters which were largely ignored by the French Air Force but purchased in large quantities abroad and licence-built in Italy, Switzerland, and Czechoslovakia. The company was liquidated in January 1927, with the only remaining active programme (the D.27) being transferred to EKW in Switzerland.

The company was re-established in Paris in March the following year as Société Aéronautique Française (Avions Dewoitine) or SAF. After briefly continuing D.27 production, the reconstituted firm produced a range of fighters that became a mainstay of the French airforce during the 1930s, the D.500 family.

It also developed important civilian airliners, such as the D.333 and its derivative the D.338, designed for pioneering routes to French Indochina (Vietnam), and eventually Hong Kong.

The firm was nationalised in March 1937 into the short-lived SNCA du Midi or SNCAM, and produced the D.520 as France's best-performing fighter at the outbreak of war, albeit in too small numbers to pose any serious opposition to the Luftwaffe in the Battle of France.

The end of Dewoitine as a recognisable entity was its absorption into SNCASE in December 1940, by which time Émile Dewoitine had departed to establish SIPA, and no further aircraft were produced under the Dewoitine name.

Aircraft

 Dewoitine D.1
 Dewoitine D.2 project
 Dewoitine D.3 project
 Dewoitine D.4 project
 Dewoitine D.5 project
 Dewoitine D.6 project
 Dewoitine D.7
 Dewoitine D.9
 Dewoitine D.10 project
 Dewoitine D.13 project
 Dewoitine D.14
 Dewoitine D.15
 Dewoitine D.17 project
 Dewoitine D.18 project
 Dewoitine D.19
 Dewoitine D.21
 Dewoitine D.22 project
 Dewoitine D.23 project
 Dewoitine D.24 project
 Dewoitine D.25
 Dewoitine D.26
 Dewoitine D.27
 Dewoitine D.28
 Dewoitine D.30
 Dewoitine D.33
 Dewoitine D.35
 Dewoitine D.332
 Dewoitine D.338
 Dewoitine D.371
 Dewoitine D.372
 Dewoitine D.420 project
 Dewoitine D.430
 Dewoitine D.440 project
 Dewoitine D.450 project
 Dewoitine D.470 project
 Dewoitine D.480
 Dewoitine D.481
 Dewoitine D.490 project
 Dewoitine D.500
 Dewoitine D.513
 Dewoitine D.520
 Dewoitine D.551
 Dewoitine D.560
 Dewoitine D.580 project
 Dewoitine D.590 project
 Dewoitine D.600 project
 Dewoitine D.640 project
 Dewoitine D.650 project
 Dewoitine D.660 project
 Dewoitine D.680 project
 Dewoitine D.710 project
 Dewoitine D.750
 Dewoitine D.760 project
 Dewoitine D.770
 Dewoitine D.800 project
 Dewoitine D.810 project
 Dewoitine D.820 project
 Dewoitine D.860 project 
 Dewoitine D.900 project
 Dewoitine HD.460 project
 Dewoitine HD.730
 Dewoitine P-1

References

 

Defunct aircraft manufacturers of France
Manufacturing companies established in 1920
Manufacturing companies disestablished in 1929
1920 establishments in France
1929 disestablishments in France